Liturgusa is the type genus of praying mantises of the family Liturgusidae. The genus consists of more than twenty species with a Neotropical distribution.

The behaviour of Liturgusa species is remarkable in that, in contrast to other mantises, they do not ambush their prey, but use an active hunting method at high walking speed.

Species
The Mantodea Species File lists:
Liturgusa actuosa Rehn, 1951
Liturgusa algorei Svenson, 2014
Liturgusa bororum Svenson, 2014
Liturgusa cameroni Svenson, 2014
Liturgusa cayennensis Saussure, 1869 - type species
Liturgusa charpentieri Giglio-Tos, 1927
Liturgusa cura Svenson, 2014
Liturgusa cursor Rehn, 1951
Liturgusa dominica Svenson, 2014
Liturgusa fossetti Svenson, 2014
Liturgusa guyanensis La Greca, 1939
Liturgusa kirtlandi Svenson, 2014
Liturgusa krattorum Svenson, 2014
Liturgusa lichenalis Gerstaecker, 1889
Liturgusa manausensis Svenson, 2014
Liturgusa maroni Svenson, 2014
Liturgusa maya Saussure & Zehntner, 1894
Liturgusa milleri Svenson, 2014
Liturgusa neblina Svenson, 2014
Liturgusa nubeculosa Gerstaecker, 1889
Liturgusa purus Svenson, 2014
Liturgusa stiewei Svenson, 2014
Liturgusa tessae Svenson, 2014
Liturgusa trinidadensis Svenson, 2014
Liturgusa zoae Svenson, 2014

References

External links 

 
 

Mantodea genera
Liturgusidae